Hong Kong Champions & Chater Cup is a Hong Kong Thoroughbred horse race held annually in late May or early June at Sha Tin Racecourse. A Group One race that offers a purse of HK$12,000,000, it is run on turf over a distance of 2400 meters (prior to 1995 it was disputed over 2200 meters and prior to 1992 over 1800 meters) and is open to horses three years of age and older. The third leg of the Hong Kong Triple Crown, it follows the Steward's Cup in January and the Hong Kong Gold Cup in February.

The Hong Kong Champions & Chater Cup was first run in 1870 as "The Champion Stakes". There was another race known as  "The Chater Cup"  in the early years in honor of renowned Hong Kong businessman and racehorse owner, Sir Paul Chater. Since 1955, "The Champion Stakes" and "The Chater Cup" were combined and has been known by its current name.

Winners since 1990

 Since 1992 the race was disputed over 2200 meters.

 Since 1995 the race is disputed over 2400 meters.

See also
 List of Hong Kong horse races

References
Racing Post:

 Racing Information of Standard Chartered Champions & Chater Cup (2011/12)
 The Hong Kong Jockey Club 

Recurring sporting events established in 1870
Horse races in Hong Kong
Open middle distance horse races
Triple Crown of Thoroughbred Racing
1870 establishments in Hong Kong